Angelika Dünhaupt (born 22 December 1946) is a German luger who competed representing West Germany during the late 1960s and early 1970s. At the 1968 Winter Olympics in Grenoble, she originally finished sixth in the women's singles event, but was awarded the bronze medal upon the disqualifications of the East German team of Ortrun Enderlein (who finished first), Anna-Maria Müller (second), and Angela Knösel (fourth) when the East Germans were discovered to have their runners being illegally heated.

Dünhaupt also won the silver medal in the women's singles event at the 1967 FIL European Luge Championships in Königssee, West Germany.

References
 
 
 
 Wallenchinsky, David. (1984). "Luge: Women's Singles". In The Complete Book the Olympics: 1896-1980. New York: Penguin Books. p. 577.

1946 births
Living people
German female lugers
Lugers at the 1968 Winter Olympics
Olympic bronze medalists for West Germany
Olympic medalists in luge
Olympic lugers of West Germany
Medalists at the 1968 Winter Olympics